A statue of American Revolutionary War hero William Prescott by William Wetmore Story is installed next to the Bunker Hill Monument in Charlestown, Boston, Massachusetts, United States.

Description and history
The bronze sculpture was cast in 1880 in Rome by the founder Alessandro Nelli and dedicated in 1881. It measures approximately 8 ft. x 4 ft. x 5 ft. 10 in., and rests on a red and grey Quincy granite base that measures approximately 6 ft. 2 in. x 5 ft. 4 in. x 5 ft. 10 in. The work was surveyed by the Smithsonian Institution's "Save Outdoor Sculpture!" program in 1994.

References

External links
 

1881 establishments in Massachusetts
1881 sculptures
Bronze sculptures in Massachusetts
Charlestown, Boston
Monuments and memorials in Boston
Outdoor sculptures in Boston
Sculptures of men in Massachusetts
Statues in Boston